A Tale of Three Cities is a 2015 Chinese-Hong Kong war romance film directed by Mabel Cheung. The film is about the real love story of two people (Charles and Lee-Lee Chan, parents of Jackie Chan) who met in Wuhu during the Second Sino-Japanese War in the 1930s, separated in Shanghai during the Chinese Civil War in the 1940s, and finally reunited in Hong Kong  in the 1950s while their children from previous marriages were left behind in mainland China (whom they would not see again until 38 years later). Jackie Chan reportedly "cried and cried, until the end of the film" when he watched the film by himself.

Cast
 Sean Lau as Fang Daolong
 Tang Wei as Chen Yuerong
 Qin Hailu as Sister Qiu
 Jing Boran as Shou Maihua
 Huang Jue as Master Zhou
 Elaine Jin as Yuerong's mother
 Li Jianyi as grandfather
 Jiao Gang
 Philip Chan

See also
Traces of a Dragon, 2003 documentary film on Jackie Chan's parents, also directed by Cheung

References

External links
 
 

2015 films
Hong Kong war drama films
Hong Kong romantic drama films
Hong Kong epic films
2010s war films
2010s romance films
Chinese war drama films
Chinese romantic drama films
Films based on actual events
Films set in the 1940s
Films set in the 1930s
Films set in the 1950s
Heyi Pictures films
Films set in Hong Kong
Films set in Shanghai
Films set in Anhui
Films directed by Mabel Cheung
2010s Hong Kong films